Karin Uta Schallreuter is a German-born medical scientist, and emerita professor for Clinical and Experimental Dermatology at the University of Bradford, England. She has researched the fields of vitiligo and eczema.

She has a medical degree from the University of Hamburg and did post-doctoral research at the University of Minnesota, before being appointed Professor for Clinical and Experimental Dermatology at the University of Bradford in 1995. 

Her research led to the development of pseudocatalase cream for the treatment of vitiligo. She led the Institute for Pigmentary Disorders in Greifswald, Germany, associated with the University of Greifswald, which offered treatments for vitiligo including trips to Jordan for a three-week treatment combining use of this cream with climatotherapy in the UVB-rich climate of Jordan. The institute closed on 1 January 2021 for economic reasons.

Selected publications

References

External links 
Schallreuter's patents at Justia

research.com profile

Year of birth missing (living people)
Living people
Academics of the University of Bradford
University of Hamburg alumni
German dermatologists
20th-century German women scientists
21st-century German women scientists
German emigrants to England
20th-century German physicians
21st-century German physicians
German women physicians